Girolamo Aleandro (also Hieronymus Aleander; 13 February 14801 February 1542) was an Italian cardinal, and .

Life
Aleandro was born on 13 February 1480 in Motta di Livenza, in the province of Treviso, part of the Republic of Venice. He studied in Venice, where he became acquainted with Erasmus and Aldus Manutius, and at an early age was reputed one of the most learned men of the time. In 1508 he went to Paris on the invitation of Louis XII as professor of belles lettres, and held for a time the position of Rector of the University of Paris. He was an early teacher of Greek at the University and edited texts by Isocrates and Plutarch printed by Gilles de Gourmont in 1509/1510. Entering the service of Érard de La Marck, prince-bishop of Liège, he was sent by that prelate on a mission to Rome, where Pope Leo X retained him, giving him (1519) the office of librarian of the Vatican. In the following year he went to Germany to be present as papal nuncio at the coronation of Emperor Charles V, and was also present at the Diet of Worms, where he headed the opposition to Martin Luther, advocating the most extreme measures to repress the doctrines of the reformer. His conduct evoked the fiercest denunciations of Luther, but it also displeased more moderate men, especially Erasmus. The edict against the reformer, which was finally adopted by the emperor and the diet, was drawn up and proposed by Aleandro. After the close of the Diet, the papal nuncio went to the Netherlands, where he instigated the executions of two monks of Antwerp due to their embrace of the Reformation, resulting in their being burnt in Brussels.

In August 1524 Pope Clement VII appointed Aleandro the Archbishop of Brindisi, for which office he was ordained to the priesthood two months later. The pope then sent him as nuncio to the court of King Francis I of France. He was taken prisoner along with that monarch at the Battle of Pavia in 1525, and was released only on payment of a heavy ransom. He was subsequently employed on various papal missions, especially to Germany, but was unsuccessful in preventing the German princes from making a truce with the reformers, or in checking to any extent the progress of the reformers' doctrines.

Aleandro was eventually consecrated a bishop on 28 February 1528 to fulfill the duties of his office. He was created a cardinal in pectore on 22 December 1536 by Pope Paul III (at the same time as Reginald Pole), which was published (i.e., publicly announced) only on 13 March 1538, at which time he was able to assume that office. He was given the rank of Cardinal Priest, with his titular church in Rome as San Ciriaco alle Terme Diocleziane, which was changed a week later to the Church of San Crisogono.

Aleandro resigned as Archbishop of Brindisi on 30 January 1541. He died at Rome on 1 February 1542. His remains were initially buried in his titular church, but later were transferred to his hometown and re-buried there in the Church of San Niccolò.

Writings
Aleandro compiled a Lexicon Graeco-Latinum (1512), and wrote Latin verse of considerable merit inserted in the Carmina Illustrium Poetarum Italiorum of Joannes Matthaeus Toscanus. The Vatican Library contains a volume of manuscript letters and other documents written by him in connection with his various missions against Luther. They were used by Pallavicino in his Istoria del Concilio Tridentino (i. 23‑28), who gives a very partial account of the Worms conference.

In popular culture
Aleandro is depicted by Jonathan Firth in the 2003 film Luther as the main antagonist. In the film, his name is seen as Girolamo Aleander.

See also
 Hochstratus Ovans

References

Sources

1480 births
1542 deaths
People from Motta di Livenza
16th-century Italian cardinals
Roman Catholic archbishops of Brindisi
Venetian Renaissance humanists
16th-century Italian Roman Catholic archbishops
Apostolic Nuncios to the Holy Roman Empire
Burials at San Crisogono
Italian librarians
16th-century Latin-language writers